António Albuquerque de Almeida Fonseca (born 30 April 1938) is a former Portuguese professional footballer.

Career statistics

Club

Notes

References

1938 births
Living people
Portuguese footballers
Association football defenders
Segunda Divisão players
Primeira Liga players
Atlético Clube de Portugal players
S.L. Benfica footballers
Vitória S.C. players
Varzim S.C. players
F.C. Barreirense players